Ken Herock (born July 16, 1941) is a former American college and professional football player who played tight end.  He played collegiately at West Virginia and professionally in the American Football League (AFL), where he played for the AFL Champion Oakland Raiders in the second AFL-NFL World Championship Game, held after the 1967 season. He attended Munhall High School in Pittsburgh.  His six-year pro career was spent with the Oakland Raiders, who he helped win the AFL title, the Cincinnati Bengals, and the Boston Patriots. After his playing career ended, Herock was a player personnel executive in the NFL with the Raiders, the Tampa Bay Buccaneers, and the Atlanta Falcons. He is known for trading Brett Favre from the Falcons to the Green Bay Packers at the urging of head coach Jerry Glanville.

Herock was born in Pittsburgh. In High School, he played volleyball, baseball, basketball, and football. Ken Now lives in Gainesville, Georgia and is in the West Virginia Hall of Fame. Herock spent seven seasons as the Raiders' personnel director, and was credited with helping build their Super Bowl XI championship team. He followed Ron Wolf to the expansion Buccaneers, where he held the title of Director of Player Personnel for the team's first eight years. During his tenure, the Buccaneers reached the playoffs in only four years, at that time the fastest of any NFL team. At the expiration of his contract in 1984, Herock found that he could make more money than he was being offered by Buccaneers owner Hugh Culverhouse, but the frugal Culverhouse refused to increase his offer. Coach Howard Schnellenberger then made Herock his first hire, offering him the same position with the USFL Washington Federals. This failed to pan out, as the team's planned move to Miami coincided with the USFL's planned move to a fall schedule, and their prospective owner canceled his purchase of the team rather than try to compete head-to-head with the Miami Dolphins and Hurricanes.

He has 2 sons, one being the assistant director of scouting for the Oakland Raiders. Ken also has 5 grandchildren.

References 

1941 births
Living people
American Football League players
American football wide receivers
Boston Patriots players
Cincinnati Bengals players
Oakland Raiders players
People from Munhall, Pennsylvania
Players of American football from Pennsylvania
Sportspeople from the Pittsburgh metropolitan area
Tampa Bay Buccaneers executives
West Virginia Mountaineers football players